Decadocrinus is an extinct genus of crinoids from the Early Carboniferous of Europe and North America.

References 

Prehistoric crinoid genera
Carboniferous crinoids
Carboniferous echinoderms of Europe
Carboniferous echinoderms of North America
Paleozoic life of Alberta